Barry Day (born 27 February 1954) is a former Australian rules footballer who played for the Essendon Football Club in the Victorian Football League (VFL).

Notes

External links 
		
Barry Day's profile at Essendonfc.com

Living people
1954 births
Australian rules footballers from Western Australia
Essendon Football Club players
West Perth Football Club players